Benjamin Isaac Hoffman (born December 13, 1974), is an American comedian, actor, writer, and musician. Hoffman is well known by his country musician alter ego Wheeler Walker, Jr., as whom he has released four albums of country music rife with profanity and sexually-explicit lyrics. 

His first album as Wheeler Walker, Jr., Redneck Shit, debuted in 2016 at number nine on the Billboard Hot Country Albums chart and number one on the Billboard Top Comedy Albums chart, making it the first album in over a decade to debut in the top ten on both those charts simultaneously. Despite no FM radio play, Hoffman found success with streaming and social media. 

Reception to Hoffman's music has been mixed, largely due to the raunchiness of his lyrics and themes. Some have called the Wheeler Walker, Jr. character an "experiment in free speech" and "a platform to speak out against censorship and bias in the music industry". Hoffman has been vocal about his use of the character as a means to express his displeasure with the modern state of the country music industry, particularly the rise of the bro-country subgenre.

Early life
Hoffman was born in Lexington, Kentucky. He is the older brother of Scissor Sisters bassist Babydaddy (Scott Hoffman). Hoffman is Jewish and attended Tulane University.

Career
Hoffman created and hosted The Ben Show, which premiered on Comedy Central on February 28, 2013. The show was broadcast for one season.

He was a writer and correspondent for the Sports Show with Norm Macdonald, and has written for the MTV Video Music Awards, Archer, and The Late Late Show with James Corden. He has appeared in acting roles on Arrested Development, New Girl and Drunk History and has produced content for and appeared on InfoMania.

In 2018, Hoffman created the Netflix adult animation comedy series Hoops. In addition to writing, he provided voice talent and was also an executive producer alongside Phil Lord, Christopher Miller, Seth Cohen, and Jake Johnson. The show was cancelled after the completion of one season.

Wheeler Walker, Jr.
Hoffman debuted an early version of the satirical country music artist Wheeler Walker, Jr. character on a skit for The Ben Show in 2013 where he performed his song "Eatin' Pussy, Kickin' Ass".

He recorded and released his first album, Redneck Shit, on February 12, 2016 via Thirty Tigers and Pepper Hill Records. The album was produced by Dave Cobb out of Nashville and originally premiered via stream on the pornographic website PornHub. It debuted at number nine on the Billboard Top Country Albums chart, number one on the Billboard Top Comedy Albums chart, and number 127 on the US Billboard 200. It was the first album to debut in both the top ten of the comedy and country charts. It sold 5,900 copies in its first week.

Rolling Stone called it "Unfathomably obscene and undeniably offensive, the debut album from Nashville never-was Wheeler Walker Jr. is also goddamn funny. But Redneck Shit is far from just an X-rated novelty record."

The Wheeler Walker, Jr. persona has been compared to other artists such as Chinga Chavin, Andy Kaufman, and David Allan Coe. The character's fictional biography outlines his history as an unsigned Nashville talent too crude for mainstream radio due to his desire to revamp the classic outlaw country style by playing songs that would have "gotten him yanked off the Grand Ol' Opry broadcast in a matter of seconds", although he finally found success with the rise of uncensored satellite radio and the internet. 

On April 16, 2016, Hoffman appeared as the character on the Joe Rogan Experience podcast episode #786. He has been a guest on a number of other podcasts including Your Mom's House with Tom Segura and Christina Pazsitzky, The Church of What's Happening Now with Joey Diaz, The official Podcast and Bertcast with Bert Kreischer. He also appeared and performed live on The Howard Stern Wrap Up Show on May 25, 2017.

His second album, Ol' Wheeler, was released on June 2, 2017 and debuted at number 10 on the Billboard Top Country Albums chart, with 7,800 copies sold in its first week. It also debuted at number one on the Billboard Top Comedy Albums chart where it remained for three consecutive weeks, and peaked at number five on the Billboard Country chart. Prior to the album's release, crowd funding music site PledgeMusic removed the album's pre-sales and refunded fans due to obscenity complaints. Upset, Hoffman claimed censorship and angry fans responded by trolling a page promoting the band 311. The album was originally going to include a duet with Grammy Award-winning artist Maren Morris on the song "Fuckin' Around", but it was pulled by Sony Music Nashville. Hoffman had previously performed alongside Morris and Jake Owen at a party following the 50th Annual Country Music Association Awards in 2016. The duet was instead recorded with Nikki Lane, credited as "Kacey Walker".

Hoffman toured throughout the United States from 2016 through 2018. During the summer of 2018, he toured with Kid Rock and Brantley Gilbert in the Red Blooded Rock n Roll Redneck Extravaganza Tour. He also performed his song "Sit On My Face" alongside Tyler Childers and Sturgill Simpson at Hinterland Music Festival in 2018. Hoffman, outfitted as Wheeler, presented an award to Childers at the Americana Music Honors & Awards that same year. Hoffman concluded his tour on December 8, 2018 with a final concert at The Rave in Milwaukee, Wisconsin.

His third album, WW III, was released on November 30, 2018. The album topped the Comedy chart and also sat at number one on the iTunes Country chart. He released first greatest hits compilation entitled Fuck You Bitch: All Time Greatest Hits on May 1, 2020. It features material from his three studio albums along with two new tracks, "Drunk as Fuck" and "Go Big or Go Home".

On March 8, 2022, Hoffman, outfitted in the Wheeler Walker, Jr. persona, was removed by security from the Country Music Hall of Fame property in Nashville after protesting the Florida Georgia Line exhibit. He held a picket sign reading "FGL does not belong here", citing a belief that the duo's music is pop and not country.

On April 14, 2022, Hoffman commenced his 2022 Comeback Tour when he headlined the historic Ryman Auditorium in Nashville, his first live performance since 2018. He promoted the concert by joking about his desire to get "cancelled". The concert sold out, and broke records for alcohol and merchandise sales at the venue. 

On April 15, 2022, he released his fourth album, Sex, Drugs & Country Music. It debuted at number one on the iTunes chart and number two on the Comedy albums chart.

Discography

Studio albums

Filmography

Television

Acting roles

Music videos

References

External links

1974 births
Living people
Male actors from Kentucky
American stand-up comedians
American country singer-songwriters
American male film actors
American male television actors
American male voice actors
American television writers
American male television writers
Jewish American writers
Jewish American comedians
Jewish American male actors
Outlaw country singers
Comedians from Kentucky
21st-century American male actors
21st-century American comedians
21st-century American singers
21st-century American screenwriters
21st-century American male writers
21st-century American Jews